Lilia Boumrar (born 20 October 1988) is an Algerian former footballer who played as a forward. She has been a member of the Algeria women's national team.

Club career
Boumrar has played for Bagneux, FC Vendenheim and Saint-Maur in France.

International career
Boumrar capped for Algeria at senior level during the 2006 African Women's Championship.

References

1988 births
Living people
People from Tizi Ouzou Province
Algerian women's footballers
Women's association football forwards
Algeria women's international footballers
Algerian emigrants to France
Naturalized citizens of France
French women's footballers
Division 1 Féminine players
French sportspeople of Algerian descent